Branding may refer to:

Physical markings
 Making a mark, typically by charring:
 Wood branding, permanently marking, by way of heat, typically of wood (also applied to plastic, cork, leather, etc.)
 Livestock branding, the marking of animals to indicate ownership such as 
 Human branding, body modification done for various reasons, voluntary and involuntary, throughout history
 Freeze branding, permanently marking by way of cold
 Vehicle title branding, a permanent designation indicating that a vehicle has been "written off"

Marketing

 Brand, a name, logo, slogan, and/or design scheme associated with a product or service
 Branding (promotional), the distribution of merchandise with a brand name or symbol imprinted
 Brand management, the application of marketing techniques to a specific product, product line, or brand
 Employer branding, the application of brand management to recruitment marketing and internal brand engagement
 Internet branding, brand management on the Internet
 Nation branding, the application of marketing techniques for the advancement of a country
Place branding, the application of marketing techniques for the advancement of country subdivisions
 Personal branding, people and their careers marketed as brands
 Co-branding, two companies or brands partnering on a product or service
 Branding agency, a type of marketing agency, group or a firm which specializes in creating brands
 Faith branding, the application of marketing techniques to religious institutions or individuals
 School branding, the application of marketing techniques to education organizations

See also
 Branded (disambiguation)